Olabiran Blessing Muyiwa (born 7 September 1998), known as Benito, is a Nigerian professional footballer who plays for Dynamo Kyiv.

Club career
Benito was released by Russian Premier League club FC Tambov on 1 January 2020, signing a 3.5-year contract with Dynamo Kyiv on 3 January 2020.

References

External links 
 
 Player's profile at pressball.by

1998 births
Footballers from Abidjan
Living people
Nigerian footballers
Association football forwards
Nigerian expatriate footballers
Expatriate footballers in Moldova
Nigerian expatriate sportspeople in Moldova
Expatriate footballers in Uzbekistan
Nigerian expatriate sportspeople in Uzbekistan
Expatriate footballers in Belarus
Nigerian expatriate sportspeople in Belarus
Expatriate footballers in Russia
Nigerian expatriate sportspeople in Russia
Expatriate footballers in Ukraine
Nigerian expatriate sportspeople in Ukraine
Expatriate footballers in Croatia
Nigerian expatriate sportspeople in Croatia
FC Saxan players
Moldovan Super Liga players
PFC Lokomotiv Tashkent players
FC Luch Minsk (2012) players
FC Tambov players
Russian Premier League players
FC Dynamo Kyiv players
Ukrainian Premier League players
FC Olimpik Donetsk players
Croatian Football League players
HNK Gorica players